Never Trust a Hippy (or NTAH) is the first solo album by Adrian Sherwood. It was released on Peter Gabriel's Real World Records label. It includes guest performances by Sly Dunbar and Robbie Shakespeare and S. E. Rogie (sampled from the title track of the album Dead Men Don't Smoke Marijuana). The album also contains Sherwood's remix of the track "Paradise of Nada" by Rizwan Muazzam Qawwali and Temple of Sound.

Track listing

Personnel 

Musicians
Harry Beckett – trumpet
Crucial Tony – guitar (4)
Sly Dunbar – drums (3, 5)
Ghetto Priest – vocals (6)
Emily Sherwood Hyman – vocals (10)
Jazzwad – keyboards (1, 4, 8), bass guitar (1, 4, 8), drum machine (1, 4, 8)
Hariharan – vocals (2, 9)
Keith LeBlanc – drums (6, 11)
Steven "Lenky" Marsden – drums (2, 9)
Skip McDonald – guitar (1-3, 5-11)
Michael Mondesir – bass guitar (8)
Simon Mundey – sequencer (4), bass guitar (4)
Bonjo Iyabinghi Noah – percussion (11)
Carlton "Bubblers" Ogilvie – piano (1, 3, 5, 6, 8), bass guitar (6, 10), vocals (10), drums (10)
Rizwan-Muazzam Qawwali – vocals (7)
S. E. Rogie – vocals (6)
Robert "Robbie" Shakespeare – bass guitar (3, 5)
Denise Sherwood – vocals (9, 10)
Temple of Sound – bass guitar (7), percussion (7)
Sorra Wilson-Dickson – violin (6)

Technical personnel
Nick Coplowe – engineering, keyboards (1), bass guitar (1)
Paul Grady – mixing, recording
Kevin Metcalfe – mastering
Adrian Sherwood – producer

Release history

References

External links 
 
 Official album page (Real World Records)
 

2003 albums
Adrian Sherwood albums
Albums produced by Adrian Sherwood
Real World Records albums